Henry is a 2011 Canadian short drama film written, produced, and directed by Yan England. The film stars Gérard Poirier as Henry, an elderly retired concert pianist who is beginning to suffer the effects of Alzheimer's disease.

The film premiered at the 2011 Rhode Island International Film Festival. The film received a nomination for the 2013 Academy Award for Best Live Action Short Film. After being nominated for an Academy Award, the film was released along with all the other 15 Oscar-nominated short films in theaters by ShortsHD.

Cast 
 Gérard Poirier as Henry
 Louise Laprade as Maria
 Marie Tifo as Nathalie
 Hubert Lemire as Young Henry
 Ariane-Li Simard-Côté as Young Maria

References

External links

2011 films
Canadian drama short films
Films directed by Yan England
2011 short films
2011 drama films
French-language Canadian films
2010s Canadian films